Prouton may refer to:
 Proton (prouton was an early candidate for the name of the particle)
 Ralph Prouton, cricketer